Arben Vila (born 16 January 1961) is an Albanian footballer. He played in two matches for the Albania national football team from 1984 to 1985.

References

External links
 

1961 births
Living people
Albanian footballers
Albania international footballers
Place of birth missing (living people)
Association footballers not categorized by position